CHRA may refer to:

 Canadian Human Rights Act
 Canadian Holocaust Remembrance Association, founded by Sabina Citron
 Canadian Housing and Renewal Association
 Center hub rotating assembly, a turbocharger component
 United States Army Civilian Human Resources Agency, an Army service component commands